Hồ Thành Việt (1955–2003) was a Vietnamese-American computer engineer and entrepreneur who is credited with making desktop publishing more accessible to Vietnamese speakers.

Biography 
Việt was born in Nha Trang, South Vietnam, on July 20, 1955. He fled South Vietnam aboard a United States Navy ship on the same day that Saigon fell, leaving his family behind, and arrived in California unable to speak English. He graduated from California State University, Fullerton, in 1985 with a degree in electrical engineering. After working at various computer companies, he founded VNI Software Company in 1987 and began working there full-time the following year. VNI was one of the first companies to market software designed for the Vietnamese language.

He died on August 28, 2003, in Fountain Valley, California.

References

External links 
 VNI Software Co.
 Interviews Hồ Thành Việt, VNCR 2001.
 Người phát minh bộ chữ Việt VNI trên máy điện toán, Vietnamese
 Công ty VNI và những bước đi tới, 2001
 VNI vs. Microsoft Corporation, 1998

1955 births
2003 deaths
American computer programmers
California State University, Fullerton alumni
Vietnamese emigrants to the United States
Vietnamese community activists
Vietnamese engineers
20th-century American businesspeople
20th-century American engineers
People from Nha Trang